Patrick Bentley, better known as Taz or The Taz, is an American rock and roll drummer. He got his start as a founding member of the local Dallas punk band, The Assassins, and is probably best known for his work with The Reverend Horton Heat, Burden Brothers and session work with Izzy Stradlin and Duff McKagan of Guns N' Roses.

Taz has most recently performed with Burden Brothers, Dwarves, Hell Texas, and 76, which includes Terry Glaze (Pantera, Lord Tracy), Kinley Wolfe (The Cult, American Fuse, Lord Tracy) and Brian Harris (Queen for a Day, Lord Tracy).

Discography

With American Fuse 
 One Fell Swoop (2002)

With Burden Brothers 
 8 Ball (2002 EP)
 Queen O' Spades (2002 EP)
 Beautiful Night (2003 EP)
 Buried in Your Black Heart (2003)
 "Shadow" (2004 single)
 "Walk Away" / "Jailbreak" (2005 single)
 RYFOLAMF (Rock Your Face Off Like A Mother Fucker) (2005 live DVD)
 Mercy (2006)

With Matt Cameron 
 "Theme From Wrong Holy-O" from Flyin' Traps (1997)

With El Diablo 
 $6.99 EP (1999)

With Hillbilly Hellcats 
 Our Brand (1998)
 "The Darkside" on Big Monster Bash, Vol. 1 (1998)
 Rev it Up with the Taz (1995)

With Loaded 
 Episode 1999: Live (1999)

With P. W. Long 
 Remembered (2003)

With Duff McKagan 
 Beautiful Disease (1999)

With Pinkston 
 All That Causes Bruises (2002)

With The Reverend Horton Heat 
 Psychobilly Freakout (1990 single)
 Smoke 'em if You Got 'em (1990)
 The Full Custom Gospel Sounds (1993)
 "400 Bucks / Caliénte" (1994 single)
 Liquor in the Front (1994)
 "One Time for Me" (1994 single)
 Holy Roller (1999)
 20th Century Masters – The Millennium Collection: The Best of The Reverend Horton Heat (2006)

With Sawyer Brown 
 Drive Me Wild (1999)

With Izzy Stradlin 
 117° (1998)
 Ride On (1999)
 River (2001)
 On Down the Road (2002)
 Like a Dog (2005)
 Miami (2007)
 Fire, the acoustic album (2007)
 Concrete (2008)
 Smoke (2009)
 Wave of Heat (2010)

With Tenderloin 
 Bullseye (1995)
 "Shotgun Willie" on Twisted Willie (1995)

With Bryan White 
 "You Are My Sunshine" on For Our Children Too (1996)
 "Listen Now! 	Will the Circle Be Unbroken/I'll Fly Away/Jesus Loves Me" on Amazing Grace, Vol. 2: A Country Salute to Gospel (1997)
 How Lucky I Am (1999)

External links 
 Taz Bentley's Myspace

American drummers
The Reverend Horton Heat members
Burden Brothers members
Living people
Loaded (band) members
Musicians from Dallas
Year of birth missing (living people)